The Eeklo Yeti Bears were an ice hockey team in Eeklo, Belgium. They played in the Belgian Hockey League, the top level of ice hockey in Belgium. The team ceased to exist in 2013 when their home rink closed and no other rink was found to take over the team. The players joined other ice hockey teams or transferred to inline hockey.

Belgian Hockey League Results

External links
Official website

References

Ice hockey teams in Belgium
Sport in East Flanders
Eeklo